Carlos Valdovinos is an elevated metro station on the Line 5 of the Santiago Metro, in Santiago, Chile. Platforms were lengthened in 2012 to accommodate seven-car trains. The station was opened on 5 April 1997 as part of the inaugural section of the line, from Baquedano to Bellavista de La Florida.

The station has the shape of a tube with an elliptical cross section. Staircases protrude from both sides of the station.

References

Santiago Metro stations
Railway stations opened in 1997
Santiago Metro Line 5